Matang is a mukim in Perak, Malaysia.

Matang may also refer to

China
 Matang, Suining, a Dong and Miao ethnic township of Suining County, Hunan province

India
 Matang community, an Indian caste mainly residing in the state of Maharashtra

Malaysia
 Matang Highway, an expressway located in the Malaysian state of Sarawak
 Matang (federal constituency), a federal constituency in Perak, Malaysia

Philippines
 Matang Tubig, a tourist attraction in Calamba, Laguna, Philippines